Yuanqing High School is a high school located in Hangzhou, Zhejiang. It was established in 1998, and as of 2016 had a student population of 576.

References

External links 
School Website

High schools in Zhejiang